Biddle Street, Yatton is a 44.8 hectare biological Site of Special Scientific Interest (SSSI) near the village of Yatton in North Somerset, notified in 1994.

Management practices and the variation in the soils has resulted in the watercourses supporting a wide range of aquatic plant
communities. Where open water occurs plants such as Common Water-starwort (Callitriche stagnalis), European Frogbit (Hydrocharis morsusranae), Fan-leaved water-crowfoot (Ranunculus circinatus). The calcareous influence of the
underlying Compton soils also encourages Whorled Water-milfoil (Myriophyllum verticillatum) and Stonewort (Chara sp). Also present are the nationally scarce Rootless Duckweed (Wolffia arrhiza) and Hairlike Pondweed (Potamogeton trichoides).

A rich invertebrate fauna is also associated with the rhynes and ditches including aquatic beetles including populations of two
nationally rare species, Hydacticus transversalis and Britain's largest water beetle, the Great Silver Water Beetle (Hydrophilus piceus). A number of dragonflies and damselflies are also found in the watercourses including the nationally scarce Variable Damselfly (Coenagrion pulchellum). Strong populations of the Common Freshwater Mussel occur as does the nationally rare Pea Mussel (Pisidium pseudosphaerium).

See also
Puxton Moor and Tickenham, Nailsea and Kenn Moors, two other similar SSSIs on the North Somerset Levels.

References

Sites of Special Scientific Interest in North Somerset
Sites of Special Scientific Interest notified in 1994